"I Wish I Could I Fall in Love Today" is a song written by Harlan Howard, and recorded by American country music artist Ray Price.  It was released in 1960 as a single only.  The song reached #5 on the Billboard Hot Country Singles & Tracks chart.

Ray Price version

Chart performance

Barbara Mandrell version
The song was also recorded by American country music artist Barbara Mandrell, under the title "I Wish That I Could Fall in Love Today".  It was released in August 1988 as the first single from the album I'll Be Your Jukebox Tonight.  The song reached #5 on the Billboard Hot Country Singles & Tracks chart, becoming Mandrell's final Top 10 single.

Charts

Weekly charts

Year-end charts

References

1960 singles
1988 singles
Ray Price (musician) songs
Barbara Mandrell songs
Songs written by Harlan Howard
Song recordings produced by Tom Collins (record producer)
Columbia Records singles
Capitol Records Nashville singles
1960 songs